The Small Bachelor is a 1927 American comedy film directed by William A. Seiter and written by John B. Clymer, Rex Taylor and Walter Anthony. It is based on the 1927 novel The Small Bachelor by P. G. Wodehouse. The film stars Barbara Kent, George Beranger, and William Austin. The film was released on November 6, 1927, by Universal Pictures. Carl Laemmle was the film's presenter.

Cast         
Barbara Kent as Molly Waddington
George Beranger as Finch
William Austin as Algernon Chubb
Lucien Littlefield	as Mr. Waddington
Carmelita Geraghty as Eulalia
Gertrude Astor as Fanny
George Davis as Garroway
Tom Dugan as Mullett
Vera Lewis as Mrs. Waddington 
Ned Sparks as J. Hamilton Beamish

References

External links
 

1927 films
1927 comedy films
1920s English-language films
Silent American comedy films
Universal Pictures films
Films directed by William A. Seiter
American silent feature films
American black-and-white films
Films based on works by P. G. Wodehouse
1920s American films